Marc Sowa (born 12 November 1963) is a Luxembourgian racewalker. He competed in the men's 20 kilometres walk at the 1988 Summer Olympics.

References

1963 births
Living people
Athletes (track and field) at the 1988 Summer Olympics
Luxembourgian male racewalkers
Olympic athletes of Luxembourg
Place of birth missing (living people)